Palomar is a Cuban bar and restaurant in Portland, Oregon.

Description
Palomar is a Cuban bar and restaurant on Division Street in southeast Portland's Hosford-Abernethy neighborhood. Brooke Jackson-Glidden of Eater Portland said Palomar has "'60s-Havana vibes", with "palm-frond wallpaper, strawberry-daiquiri-pink chairs, and gold-flecked tables".

The drink menu includes daiquiris. The food menu included "Cuban diner food" such as croquetas, empanadas, medianoche, and oysters.

History
Owner Ricky Gomez opened the bar on April 2, 2018. Palmar closed temporarily on March 15, 2020, because of the COVID-19 pandemic. The bar served a limited menu on a rooftop patio, as of July–August 2020, and had returned to dine-in service by October.

Reception
Palor was named Bar of the Year by The Oregonian. In 2018, Jackson-Glidden said the bar's "ambience is simply transportive" and wrote, "Palomar is the great people pleaser, serving playful blended daiquiris and house pineapple gin with the meticulous precision of a master bartender... The gold-flecked tables, palm tree wallpaper, and neon touches give it a breezy, fun vibe, perfect for happy hour." Palomar was named Bar of the Year and nominated in the Design of the Year category for the website's Eater Awards. In 2019, Eater Portland Alex Frane called Palomar an "essential cocktail destination" of Portland, and the website's Ron Scott included the bar in the 2020 list "Where to Find Stellar Caribbean Food in Portland".

See also
 Hispanics and Latinos in Portland, Oregon

References

External links

 
 
 Palomar at Condé Nast Traveler
 Palomar at Portland Monthly

2018 establishments in Oregon
Cuban restaurants in the United States
Cuban-American culture in Portland, Oregon
Drinking establishments in Oregon
Hosford-Abernethy, Portland, Oregon
Latin American restaurants in Portland, Oregon
Restaurants established in 2018